Bob Falkenburg defeated John Bromwich in the final 7–5, 0–6, 6–2, 3–6, 7–5 to win the gentlemen's singles tennis title at the 1948 Wimbledon Championships. Jack Kramer was the defending champion, but was ineligible to compete after turning professional at the end of the 1947 season.

Seeds

  Frank Parker (fourth round)
  John Bromwich (final)
  Gardnar Mulloy (semifinals)
  Tom Brown (quarterfinals)
  Jaroslav Drobný (second round)
  Budge Patty (quarterfinals)
  Bob Falkenburg (champion)
  Eric Sturgess (fourth round)

Draw

Finals

Top half

Section 1

Section 2

Section 3

Section 4

Bottom half

Section 5

Section 6

Section 7

Section 8

References

External links

Men's Singles
Wimbledon Championship by year – Men's singles